Ķegums is a town in Ogre Municipality situated mostly on the right bank of the Daugava River. Latvian law defines Ķegums town as divided between two regions, Vidzeme on the right bank of the Daugava and Semigallia on the left bank.

History
The construction of the town was started in 1936 as a settlement to house the workers constructing the Ķegums Hydroelectric Power Station. Ķegums was granted town status in 1991.

Sport
Ķegums has been host to the Latvian Grand Prix of Motocross World Championship and Sidecarcross World Championship numerous times.
Ķegums hosted Latvian Grand Prix of Motocross World Championship during the 2009, 2010, 2011, 2012, 2013 and 2015.

See also
List of cities in Latvia
Latvian fleet that fought for the Allies in World War II – one of the ships held the name of the town

References

Towns in Latvia
1993 establishments in Latvia
Ogre Municipality
Vidzeme
Semigallia